Ragnhild Caroline Monrad (31 July 1879, Gran, Oppland – 23 February 1950) was a Norwegian singer, actress and poet. She studied singing in Dresden, stayed in Berlin for a long time, toured with Edvard Grieg, performed for King Oscar II, Haakon VII and Emperor William II. She was a very popular opera singer in Norway, Sweden, Denmark and Germany.

She ended up as a member of the Nazi Party Nasjonal Samling, and was theatre director at Det Norske Teatret from 1942 to 1945, during the German occupation of Norway.

She was sentenced to one year imprisonment in 1947.

Cally Monrad was the sister of the painter Julie Gjessing (born Julie Monrad).

Further reading

External links

References

1879 births
1950 deaths
People from Gran, Norway
Members of Nasjonal Samling
Norwegian stage actresses
Norwegian women singers
Norwegian theatre directors
People convicted of treason for Nazi Germany against Norway
Norwegian women in World War II